Delta is an Old World genus of potter wasps with species predominantly distributed through tropical Africa and Asia. Some species are present in the Palearctic region, and a few have been introduced in the Nearctic and Neotropical regions. The members of this genus have a long metasomal petiole, like members of the genera Eumenes and Zeta.

Species
The following are species of the genus Delta:

 Delta alluaudi (Pérez, 1895)
 Delta anomalum (Zavattari, 1909)
 Delta asina  (de Saussure, 1852)
 D. a. asina  (de Saussure, 1852)
 D. a. mixtum (Giordani Soika, 1944)
 Delta bicinctum (de Saussure, 1852)
 Delta bonellii (Giordani Soika, 1944)
 Delta caffra (Linnaeus, 1767)
 Delta campaniforme (Fabricius, 1775)
 D. c. assatum (Giordani Soika, 1934)
 D. c. campaniforme (Fabricius, 1775)
 D. c. chloroticum Giordani Soika, 1979
 D. c. pseudodyscherum (Bequaert, 1925)
 D. c. pseudopulcherrimum Giordani Soika, 1968
 D. c. rhodesiense Bequaert, 1926
 D. c. tessmanni von Schulthess Rechberg, 1910
 Delta concinnum (de Saussure, 1855)
 Delta conoideum (Gmelin, 1790)
 Delta dimidiatipenne (Saussure, 1852)
 Delta emarginatum (Linnaeus, 1758)
 Delta eremnum (van der Vecht, 1959))
 Delta esuriens (Fabricius, 1787)
 Delta esuriens esuriens (Fabricius, 1787)
 Delta esuriens gracile (Saussure, 1852)
 Delta fenestrale (Saussure, 1852)
 Delta guerini (de Saussure, 1852)
 Delta higletti (Meade-Waldo, 1910)
 D. h. higletti (Meade-Waldo, 1910)
 D. h. rendalli (Bingham, 1902)
 Delta hottentotta (de Saussure, 1852)
 D. h. berlandi (Giordani Soika, 1934)
 D. h. hottentottum (de Saussure, 1852)
 D. h. nigriventre Giordani Soika, 1989
 D. h. tibesticum (Giordani Soika, 19854)
 D. h. unicoloripenne Giordani Soika, 1989
 Delta inexpectatum Giordani Soika, 1982
 Delta insulare (Smith, 1857)
 Delta latreillei (de Saussure, 1852)
 Delta lene (Bingham, 1897)
 Delta lepeleterii (de Saussure, 1852)
 D. l. formosum (de Saussure, 1852)
 D. l. lepeleterii (de Saussure, 1852)
 D. l. meruense (Cameron, 1910)
 D. l. pilosellum Giordani Soika, 1982
 Delta magnum van der Vecht, 1981
 Delta nigriculum Giordani Soika 1986
 Delta nigritarse (Meade-Waldo, 1910)
 Delta occidentale Giordani Soika, 1975
 Delta paraconicum Giordani Soika, 1972
 Delta philantes (de Saussure, 1852)
 Delta phthisicum (Gerstäcker, 1857)
 Delta pseudodimidiatipenne (Giordani Soika, 1944)
 Delta pulcherrimum (von Schulthess Rechberg, 1910)
 D. p. nigrithorax Giordani Soika, 1982
 D. p. pulcherrimum (von Schulthess Rechberg, 1910)
 Delta pyriforme (Fabricius, 1775)
 D. p. circinale (Fabricius, 1804)
 D. p. nigrocinctum Giordani Soika, 1993
 D. p. philippinense (Bequaert, 1928)
 D. p. pyriforme (Fabricius, 1775)
 Delta regina (de Saussure, 1852)
 Delta sakalavus (de Saussure, 1900)
 Delta sciarum (van der Vecht, 1959)
 Delta subfenestrale (Giordani Soika, 1939)
 Delta tropicale (de Saussure, 1852)
 Delta unguiculatum (Villers, 1789)
 Delta versicolor van der Vecht, 1981
 Delta viatrix (Nurse, 1903)
 Delta wieneckei (van der Vecht 1959)

References

Potter wasps